Mabel J. Desmond (born January 30, 1929) is an American politician and schoolteacher from Maine. Desmond, a Democrat, served four terms (1994–2002) as representative to the Maine House of Representatives.  A Democrat, District 146 included parts of northern Aroostook County, including Ashland, Castle Hill, Mapleton, New Sweden, Wade, Washburn and Woodland. She served on the education and cultural affairs committee. She is married and has four children. In 2007, the former teacher was appointed by Governor John Baldacci to the Maine State Board of Education.

Desmond graduated from the University of Maine at Presque Isle in 1964. She earned a Master's in Education from the University of Maine in 1975. She taught public school from 1949 to 1994. She also was an adjunct professor at University of Maine at Presque Isle from 1991 to 1994.

References

1929 births
Living people
People from Southampton, Massachusetts
Baptists from Maine
Democratic Party members of the Maine House of Representatives
Women state legislators in Maine
People from Aroostook County, Maine
Schoolteachers from Maine
University of Maine at Presque Isle alumni
University of Maine alumni
University of Maine at Presque Isle faculty
American women academics
21st-century American women